The Portuguese Women's Volleyball League A2  is the second women's Volleyball league in Portugal, which is also called (Portuguese: "Campeonato Nacional de Voleibol - A2").

After the 2010/2011 season, The Portuguese Women's Volleyball League A2 was cancelled, and Portuguese Women's Volleyball Second Division become the second tier in Portuguese volleyball system.

Portuguese League Champions - A2

League, Portuguese Volleyball